Olivia Rosenthal (born 1965 in Paris) is a French novelist. She won the Candide Preis in 2009, and her novel Que font les rennes après Noël ? (2010) won the Prix du Livre Inter in 2011.

References 

1965 births
Living people
French women writers
French women novelists